Stefankowice-Kolonia  is a village in the administrative district of Gmina Hrubieszów, within Hrubieszów County, Lublin Voivodeship, in eastern Poland, close to the border with Ukraine.

The village has a population of 289.

References

Stefankowice-Kolonia